Daniel Avila Mota (born October 9, 1975) is a former Major League Baseball pitcher. Mota played for the Minnesota Twins in the 2000 season. In four games, he had an 8.44 ERA in 5.1 innings pitched with three strikeouts. Mota batted and threw right-handed.

He was signed by the New York Yankees as an amateur free agent in 1994.

External links

1975 births
Living people
Dominican Republic expatriate baseball players in Canada
Dominican Republic expatriate baseball players in the United States
Edmonton Trappers players

Major League Baseball pitchers
Major League Baseball players from the Dominican Republic
Minnesota Twins players
Fort Myers Miracle players
Fort Wayne Wizards players
Gulf Coast Yankees players
Greensboro Bats players
Las Vegas 51s players
New Britain Rock Cats players
Oneonta Yankees players
Piratas de Campeche players
Salt Lake Buzz players
Sinon Bulls players
Dominican Republic expatriate baseball players in Mexico
Dominican Republic expatriate baseball players in Taiwan